Claude Verspaille (born 21 June 1964) is a retired Belgian football defender and later manager.

References

1964 births
Living people
Belgian footballers
K.V. Kortrijk players
Club Brugge KV players
R.E. Mouscron players
Association football defenders
Belgian Pro League players
Belgian football managers